Gideon "Gidi" Markuszower (born 27 October 1977) is an Israeli–Dutch politician of the Party for Freedom (PVV). He became a member of the Netherlands Senate on 9 June 2015. During the 2017 Dutch general election he was elected to the House of Representatives, and gave up his Senate seat. 

Research by the Dutch security service AIVD in 2010 suggested that he was influenced by a foreign security service, likely Mossad. When this was communicated to party leader Geert Wilders, he withdrew himself as a candidate for the Tweede Kamer.

References

External links
  Mr. G. (Gidi) Markuszower Parlement.com
  Mr. G. Markuszower (PVV) Eerste Kamer der Staten-Generaal

1977 births
Living people
21st-century Dutch politicians
Dutch corporate directors
Dutch political consultants
Hebrew University of Jerusalem alumni
Israeli corporate directors
Israeli emigrants to the Netherlands
Israeli Jews
Jewish Dutch politicians
Jewish Israeli politicians
Likud politicians
Members of the House of Representatives (Netherlands)
Members of the Senate (Netherlands)
People from Amstelveen
People from Tel Aviv
Party for Freedom politicians
People's Party for Freedom and Democracy politicians
University of Amsterdam alumni
Vrije Universiteit Amsterdam alumni